Carex foraminata is a tussock-forming species of perennial sedge in the family Cyperaceae. It is native to south eastern and south central China.

See also
List of Carex species

References

foraminata
Plants described in 1894
Taxa named by Charles Baron Clarke
Flora of China